Navajo River is a  tributary of the San Juan River. It flows from a source in the South San Juan Wilderness of Conejos County, Colorado southwest past Chromo, Colorado.  The river dips into New Mexico, passing just north of Dulce before heading northwest to a confluence with the San Juan in Archuleta County, Colorado. A large portion of its water is diverted across the Continental Divide to the Rio Grande basin as part of the San Juan–Chama Project.

See also
List of rivers of Colorado
List of rivers of New Mexico
List of tributaries of the Colorado River

References

Rivers of Colorado
Rivers of New Mexico
Tributaries of the Colorado River in New Mexico
Rivers of Conejos County, Colorado
Rivers of Archuleta County, Colorado
Tributaries of the Colorado River in Colorado
Rivers of Rio Arriba County, New Mexico